"Change Partners" is a song written by Stephen Stills that was released on his 1971 album Stephen Stills 2. It was also released as the debut single from the album, just missing the Top 40, and peaking at number 43 on the Billboard Charts, during the week of July 24, 1971 and spending 9 weeks on the chart.

Music and Lyrics 
Stills said "it was about growing up in the south, attending the debutante balls, but Graham likes to refer to it as the Crosby, Stills & Nash theme song, which I suppose it is". Graham Nash has said he feels it's about the constantly changing relationships in CSNY. Jerry Garcia performs the pedal steel guitar played throughout the song. One version was recorded at Olympic Studios in London for the recording of his debut solo album, Stephen Stills. This version was released on Stills 2013 box set Carry On. The version released on Stephen Stills 2 was recorded in early 1971 at Criteria Studios, Miami, and featured Graham Nash, David Crosby, photographer Henry Diltz, and Fred Neil on backing vocals.

Reception 
Paste Magazine called it a "catchy pop hit".  Cash Box described the song as being "a production showcase, rather than a top forty-rhythm outing" and more of "an FM preview teaser than a teen sales effort."

Chart history

References 

1971 songs
Stephen Stills songs
Songs written by Stephen Stills
Song recordings produced by Stephen Stills
Atlantic Records singles